For the Nynorsk dictionary with the same title, see Norsk Ordbok (Nynorsk).

The Norsk Ordbok (Riksmål) (full title Norsk Ordbok; riksmål og moderat bokmål) is a written Norwegian dictionary in the Riksmål form of Norwegian (or moderate Bokmål). It was first published by Kunnskapsforlaget in 1993 under the title Norsk Illustrert Ordbok (Norwegian Illustrated Dictionary), and was first edited by Tor Guttu.  

Riksmål is an unofficial Norwegian language form developed in Norway during the 19th and 20th centuries. It is based on the Danish-Norwegian language tradition which utilizes Danish writing and Norwegian speech. The language had spelling reforms in 1907 and 1917.

References

External links
 Ordnett – Norwegian paysite with several dictionaries.
 ordbok.uib.no  - Norwegian FOSS (Publicly financed) dictionaries To be released under CC-BY 4.0 on 24 December 2023.

1993 non-fiction books
Norwegian dictionaries